Gabriel Morgan Hamer-Webb (born 7 November 2000 in Bath, England) is an English professional rugby union footballer. He plays as a winger for Bath.

Hamer-Webb was a pupil at Beechen Cliff School and had trials at Southampton, Bristol City and Yeovil Town football clubs before taking up a place on the school's Academic and Sporting Excellence (AASE) partnership with Bath Rugby. He signed a senior academy contract with the club ahead of the 2019-20 season, and he made his debut in a Premiership Rugby Cup defeat against Exeter Chiefs on 21 September 2019. He made his Premiership debut as a head injury replacement for Max Wright against Wasps on 2 November 2019, before scoring his first try for the club against Ulster in the European Rugby Champions Cup two weeks later.

On 10 January 2020, Alan Dickens named Hamer-Webb in his 32-man England squad for the 2020 Six Nations Under 20s Championship. He made his debut in the opening game against France, in which he was sin binned for a tip tackle on Nolann Le Garrec.

References

External links
Premiership Rugby Profile
European Professional Club Rugby Profile
Bath Rugby Profile

2000 births
Living people
Bath Rugby players
English rugby union players
People educated at Beechen Cliff School
Rugby union players from Bath, Somerset
Rugby union wings